Nicholas "Nick" Mayhugh (born February 27, 1996) is an American T37 and T38 Paralympic sprint runner and soccer player. He represented the United States at the 2020 Summer Paralympics.

Soccer
Mayhugh played soccer at Radford University from 2015 to 2018. He also played for the United States men's Paralympic soccer team where he helped team USA win a bronze medal at the 2019 Parapan American Games in the 7-a-side football, their first ever medal in the event at the Parapan American Games. He finished second in the tournament with eight goals in six games. He was subsequently named U.S. Soccer Player of the Year with a Disability in 2019.

Paralympics
Mayhugh represented the United States in the men's 100 metres T37 event at the 2020 Summer Paralympics where he set a world record with a time of 10.95 and won a gold medal. He competed in the men's 400 metres T37 event and won a silver medal. He also competed in the mixed 4 × 100 metres relay event and won a gold medal.

References

External links
 
 
 

1996 births
Living people
Sportspeople from Fairfax, Virginia
American male sprinters
American soccer players
Radford Highlanders men's soccer players
Paralympic track and field athletes of the United States
Paralympic gold medalists for the United States
Paralympic silver medalists for the United States
Paralympic medalists in athletics (track and field)
Athletes (track and field) at the 2020 Summer Paralympics
Medalists at the 2020 Summer Paralympics
Medalists at the 2019 Parapan American Games
Association footballers not categorized by position